The Kuankuoshui salamander (Pseudohynobius kuankuoshuiensis) is a species of salamander in the family Hynobiidae endemic to China and only know from its type locality, Puchang-Kuankuoshui Nature Reserve (蒲昌宽阔水) in Suiyang County, Guizhou Province. Its natural habitats are temperate forests, streams, and pools. It is threatened by habitat loss.

References

Pseudohynobius
Amphibians of China
Endemic fauna of China
Amphibians described in 2007